Zaouiet Kounta is a town in southern Algeria.

Localities  of the commune 
The commune is composed of 17 localities:

References

Communes of Adrar Province